A balk is an illegal motion by a baseball pitcher.

It may also refer to:

Places 
 Balk, North Yorkshire, England
 Balk, Netherlands, a village

People 
 Fairuza Balk (born 1974), American film actress
 Harry Balk (1925–2016), American record producer and executive
 Hermann Balk, 13th century Master of the Teutonic and Livonian Orders
 Jordi Balk (born 1994), Dutch footballer
 Lars Balk (born 1996), Dutch field hockey player

Other
 , a wall of intact earth in an archaeological excavation

See also
 Balck, a surname
 Balkh Province, a province in northern Afghanistan
 Balkh, an ancient city in what is now northern Afghanistan
 Balka (disambiguation)
 Balkline